This is the filmography of Indian actor Jaishankar, who performed roles ranging from hero to villain. He was credited on screen with the title of Makkal Kalaignar Jaishankar or Makkal Tamilan in most of his films, sometimes referred to as Thennagathu James Bond (South Indian James Bond). In the era dominated by Sivaji Ganesan, M. G. Ramachandran and Ravichandran ,Gemini Ganesan, he created his own niche with portrayals of westernised characters.

Jaishankar made his film debut in 1965, in the film Iravum Pagalum, directed by Joseph Thaliath Jr. The film was released on 14 January 1965 on Thai Pongal day. Despite facing competition from Enga Veettu Pillai and Pazhani, released on the same day, the film become a commercial success. He generally starred in romance, comedy and action films (especially as detective). In the following year he acted in  Enga Veettu Penn (1965), Panchavarna Kili, where he played in a dual role, and the film become a commercial success. Jaishankar starred in Kuzhandaiyum Deivamum (1965), where he played a divorced husband, an adaptation of Disney's The Parent Trap, directed by Krishnan–Panju, produced by AVM Productions. It was a commercial success and won the National Film Award for Best Feature Film in Tamil, and in Nee, he played a college student, pairing with Jayalalithaa for the first time, which become a commercial success. In 1966, he acted in the Psychological thriller film Yaar Nee?, produced by P. S. Veerappa, it was remake of the Hindi film Woh Kaun Thi? (1964). The film became successful at the box office. In 1967, he acted in the romantic-comic fantasy film Pattanathil Bhootham, starring with K. R. Vijaya, the film was heavily inspired by the 1964 American film The Brass Bottle, the film was directed by M. V. Raman, and the film was released on Tamil Puthandu. Despite facing competition from Magaraasi, released on same day, it become a major commercial success. In 1969, he acted in a comedy film Poova Thalaiya, where he played the role of a successful son-in-law, who will compete with an arrogant aunt. The film was a box office success, running for 100 days in many centers of Tamil Nadu and also all over India. In the same year he gives another major success; Akka Thangai, he played a suspected brother and the film was directed by M. A. Thirumugam. The film was huge hit at the box office and won the Tamil Nadu Film Award for Best Film (Second Prize). He starred in  Mannippu, where he played an artist and falsely charged his finance missing case, it becomes a successful at the box office and the film was remake of Malayalam film Padunna Puzha.

In Maanavan (1970), he played a young man who becomes a district administrator from the poverty level. Maanavan proved a commercial success. In 1970 he acted comedy film Veettuku Veedu, based on the play Thikku Theriyadha Veettil and later 2001 Viswanathan Ramamoorthy based on this film, it became a huge hit at the box office. He starred in Ethirkalam with Gemini Ganesan and he acted western-adventure film Kalam Vellum (1970), all the films became successful at the box office. In Nootrukku Nooru (1971), he played a college professor, who is accused by three college girls of sexual harassment, the film was directed by K. Balachander under his production Kalakendra. It was one of the film milestones of Shankar's career and he won the Film Fans Association Best Actor Award in 1971.

Jaishankar worked under Modern Theatres film such as Iru Vallavargal (1966), Vallavan Oruvan (1966), Kadhalithal Podhuma (1967), Naangu Killadigal, Neelagiri Express (1968), CID Shankar, Karundhel Kannayiram (1972),  Thedi Vandha Lakshmi (1973).

Between 1980 and 1999 Jaishankar emerged with latest actors like Rajinikanth, Kamal Haasan, Vijayakanth, Sathyaraj, Thiagarajan, Mohan, Prabhu, Arjun, Vijay and played lead villain and in character role. In Murattu Kalai (1980), he reprised his villain role and co-starred with Rajinikanth. In Vidhi (1984), he played a rich criminal lawyer and father of playboy son, the film became a commercial success. In 1984, he acted in the thriller film 24 Mani Neram, where he played an investigator, the film was directed by Manivannan and in the same year he worked under Balu Mahendra's in Neengal Kettavai. In 1985, he played actress Nadhiya's father's role in Poove Poochooda Vaa, directed by Fazil. Later, he acted in horror-thriller films such as Yaar? and Pillai Nila (both released in 1985) and he played in the crime thriller film Saavi, in which he played a CID Inspector and solved a murder case. The film was based on American film Dial M for Murder. The film was a commercial hit at the box office. In the film Oomai Vizhigal (1986), he ran unprofitable Magazine Dhinamurasu, he was an editor of the magazine, the film was made by Film college students and ran over 100 days in theatres. In 1989, he acted in science fiction-horror film Naalai Manithan, in which he played a mad scientist who invents as drug which gives back life to the dead if injected within two hours of death, it became a profitable venture.

Filmography

1960s

1970s

1980s

1990s

2000s

Television

References

External links

Indian filmographies
Male actor filmographies